This is a list of Como dice el dicho episodes.

Series overview

Episodes

Season 1 (2011)

Season 2 (2012)

Season 3 (2013)

Season 4 (2014)

Season 5 (2015)

Season 6 (2016)

Season 7 (2017)

Season 11 (2021)

References

External links 
Official site

Lists of Mexican drama television series episodes